Geigerite is a mineral, a complex hydrous manganese arsenate with formula: Mn5(AsO3OH)2(AsO4)2·10H2O. It forms triclinic pinacoidal, vitreous, colorless to red to brown crystals. It has a Mohs hardness of 3 and a specific gravity of 3.05.

It was discovered in Grischun, Switzerland in 1989. It was named
in honor of Thomas Geiger (1886–1976), Wiesendangen, Switzerland, who studied the Falotta manganese ores.

Composition

The chemical composition of geigerite is hydrous manganese arsenate (Mn5(AsO3OH)2(AsO4)2·10H2O). The chemical composition was found by using an electron microprobe in the Falotta mines in Switzerland.

Geologic occurrence

Geigerite can be found in the abandoned manganese mine in Oberhalbstein, Switzerland. It is mainly found in cavities in adiolarites, which are a form of igneous rock that have either a 
radial or fanlike texture of crystals. Geigerite is then formed by metamorphism of manganese 
oxide ores. Recently, geigerite has been found in Fukushima Prefecture, Japan. Geigerite has also been found in Mt. Nero Mine, Borghetto Di Vara, La Spieza, Italy.

Structure

Geigerite’s crystal system is triclinic with perfect cleavage on the {010}. The first is the AsO3OH group, and the second is the AsO4. In the acidic AsO3OH group, the As-O bonds are much shorter than the As-OH bonds. Similarly, in the AsO4 group, As-O bonds are also shorter than the As-O bonds. The remaining bonds within both arsenate groups have nearly equal distances. In the ions there are three manganese atoms, these three links to six oxygen atoms to form a normal octahedral formation.

Special characteristics

One interesting structural feature of geigerite is the presence of a complicated network of 
hydrogen bonds, which exceed the number of the hydrogen atoms. Geigerite
is classified under a group of metal copper (II) arsenates called the Lindackerite group. Minerals 
within this group have a formula where M equals either copper, calcium, manganese, zinc, or 
cobalt.

See also
List of minerals named after people

References

Bergknappe (2000) Verein der Freunde des Bergbaus in Graubunden Stiftung Bergbaumuseum Graubunden Schelzboden-Davos. 31-32.

Manganese(II) minerals
Arsenate minerals
Triclinic minerals
Minerals in space group 2